Budhahang (Nepali:बुढाहाङ) was a Kirat Rai king of Khalsa territory of Eastern  Nepal. His palace was located in the region currently known as Ankhisalla and Chintang. It is said that the  Khalsa area of Dhankuta District included Chhintang, Khoku, Ankhisalla, Chungmang Pakhribas, Phalate, Sanne, Muga, Leguwa, Belhara and Bhirgaon  were under the Khalsa state before the Unification of Nepal.

Biography
The identity of the king is contradictory. The parents of Budhahang are also not clear. According to Kājimān Kandaṅvā (1993: 121), the name of Budhahang's father was Rakhansingh hang. Budahang was the second siblings among four brothers - Cinbassa, Rakhanbassa, Rumbassa, Rukumbassa (in order of seniority).

Budhahang had several children, the actual numbers are however unclear. It is agreed that he had seven daughters  namely 
 Sureksi
 Rakaksi
 Tigumhaŋma or Chintang Devi, 
 Jagadeo 
 Sɨŋciri
 Luŋciri
 Piccadaŋma

Budhahang had only one biological son whose name was Rucchihaŋ. It is said that Budhahang scolded his son when he killed some fishes in the pond. The boy was upset by the scolding and he jumped into the pond and died.

Budhahang disappeared when Prithivi Narayan Shah attacked him during unification of Nepal. During the war with the Shah king, he could revive all the dead Kiranti warriors who were killed using his devine powers.

Popular beliefs
According to the legend, Budhahang had superhuman capabilities. He was able to stop the movements of the sun for up to two hours.

Another story says how the children who went to the forest with Budhahang had to check his head for lice. But when they looked on his head, they saw not lice but eyes in his head. His head was covered with eyes. Furthermore, as long as the children spent their time with Budhahang it never became dark. It used to get dark only after he returns home.

See also
Nepalese folklore                                                   
Kirati people

References

Kings
18th-century Nepalese people